Locomotives of the London, Tilbury and Southend Railway. Initially, the London, Tilbury and Southend Railway (LTSR) hired Eastern Counties Railway (ECR) locomotives and then after the amalgamation of that railway into the Great Eastern Railway (GER), locomotives from that company were hired. In 1880 the company bought its first locomotive saving on hiring costs from the GER and further engines followed that year.  The LTSR principally operated tank engines, which it named after towns on the route. The railway's first locomotive superintendent was Thomas Whitelegg, who in 1910 was succeeded by his son Robert. The LTSR became part of the Midland Railway (MR) in 1912, but nevertheless continued to be operated independently.  The Midland removed locomotive names and renumbered engines.  The Midland, and its successor the London, Midland and Scottish Railway (LMS), continued to build some designs.

Locomotive classes
Steam locomotives are divided into the following classes:

The LTSR 37, 51, and 79 classes were similar, with the 51 class being lighter than the other two.

Preservation
Only one LT&SR locomotive has survived into preservation:

References

Further reading
 Bob Essery The London, Tilbury and Southend Railway and its Locomotives, OPC (2001) 
 Bob Essery and David Jenkinson An Illustrated History of LMS locomotives. Volume 4. Absorbed Pre-Group Classes Midland Division 

 
London, Tilbury And Southend Railway